Seyed Mojtaba Vahedi is an Iranian journalist and political figure with a complex background. He was born into an Islamist family and was involved in the Iranian Revolution of 1979, which overthrew the Pahlavi dynasty and established the Islamic Republic of Iran. After the revolution, Vahedi worked as a journalist and rose to become the editor-in-chief of the Aftab Yazd newspaper. He also served as a senior advisor to Mehdi Karroubi, a reformist politician and opposition figure. 

However, despite his initial involvement with the revolution, Vahedi eventually became disillusioned with the Islamic government and is now a critic of it. He has taken up employment with Reza Pahlavi, Crown Prince of Iran and serves as Pahlavi's advocate. Vahedi is actively promoting the monarchy as an alternative to the current Islamic regime of Iran.

References 

Living people
People from Qom
Iranian activists
Iranian chemical engineers
National Trust Party (Iran) politicians
1964 births